Ipochus insularis is a species of beetle in the family Cerambycidae. It was described by Blaisdell in 1925. It is known from Baja California, in Mexico.

References

Parmenini
Beetles described in 1925